MTV Chi was a spin-off network from MTV that was targeted at these Chinese Americans. The network featured various styles of music such as Mando pop, Canto pop and Chinese American hip hop. It broadcast in English and featured a mix of original programming with the best of MTV's International programming. It launched on December 6, 2005, from MTV's studios in New York City. MTV Chi aimed to show the world what Asian American pop culture is all about, with music videos imported from Taiwan, Hong Kong and China as well as original programming showcasing up-and-coming artists in the United States and around the world.

Jin's music video "Learn Chinese" was the first video ever to be played on MTV Chi.

On February 15, 2007, MTV Networks announced that MTV Chi would be shutting down. It ceased broadcasting on April 30, 2007.

VJs 
 Gregory Woo
 Angel Tang
 Simon Yin
 Xiao Wang

Shows on MTV Chi 
 Artist Profile
 Canton-In Chart
 Classic Chi
 J-K Music Non Stop
 Live From...
 Mandarin Top 20
 Maximum Chi
 MTV Chi News
 Music Wire News
 Top 10 Chi Countdown
 Untapped Chi
 WA KOW!

MTV Chi Rocks!
MTV Chi Rocks was the first concert celebrating young Chinese Americans held in San Gabriel, CA on September 23.
The concert featured the hottest names in Asian American music including Frequency5, Vienna Teng, Siris, Burning Tree Project, Kaila Yu, Adrienne Lau, Putnam Hall, and Far East Movement. Headlining the blowout event was Jin the Emcee and hip hop group Jeff and Machi.

See also 
 MTV
 MTV Asia

External links
 Official Site

Chinese-American culture
MTV channels
Music video networks in the United States
Television channels and stations established in 2005
Defunct television networks in the United States
Television channels and stations disestablished in 2007
Overseas Chinese organisations